The Women's Macau Open 2014 is the women's edition of the 2014 Macau Open, which is a tournament of the WSA World Tour event Gold (prize money: 50,000 US dollars). The event took place in Macau in the China from 21 to 26 October. Nicol David won her first Macau Open trophy, beating Raneem El Weleily in the final.

Prize money and ranking points
For 2014, the prize purse is $50,000. The prize money and points breakdown was as follows:

Seeds

Draw and results

See also
WSA World Tour 2014
Men's Macau Open 2014
Macau Open

References

External links
WSA Macau Open 2014 website

Squash tournaments in Macau
Macau Open
Macau Open (squash)
2014 in women's squash
Women's sport in Macau